"Slice of Heaven" is a single by New Zealand singer-songwriter Dave Dobbyn with the band Herbs, released in 1986 on the soundtrack of the animated motion picture, Footrot Flats: The Dog's Tail Tale. The single reached  1 on the New Zealand Singles Chart for eight weeks and on the Australian Singles Chart for four weeks. It appears on Dobbyn's 1988 album, Loyal.

Background
Dobbyn was writing in Sydney when he was given the opportunity to compose for the Footrot Flats film. He had previously used the line "Slice of Heaven" in the DD Smash album The Optimist, and chose to revisit it. He brought in Herbs to sing in the background based on his childhood experiences of Pacific gospel choirs.

Features
The song incorporates a synthesised Japanese flute made with an E-mu Emulator II.

Music video
The video features Dobbyn, Herbs and dancers recording the song, interspersed with clips from the Footrot Flats film. The music video was recorded in Wellington's Marmalade Studios. Notably, due to time constraints, the clips of the singers performing are from their live recording takes rather than being a recreation.

Alternate version
The version featured in the closing credits of the Footrot Flats movie features less emphasis on the Herbs vocals and more focus on the percussion and bass of the song.

Reception
The song gained huge exposure in Australasia through the Footrot Flats trailer being shown before the popular Crocodile Dundee film, leading to high radio play before the single had been released. According to Dobbyn, one New Zealand rock station producer refused to play the song as they considered it "underproduced", but were forced to reconsider due to huge listener demand for the song. The song spent eight weeks at No. 1 in New Zealand and four weeks at No. 1 in Australia. It has been praised for the combination of Dobbyn's and Herbs' vocals.

In other media
In season two's third episode of Wrecked, Steve (played by Rhys Darby) sings a bit of the song which intrigues the Barracuda (played by Ebonée Noel
) and reveals that her dead ex-lover was also a New Zealander.

Awards
"Slice of Heaven" was awarded Best Song at the 1986 New Zealand Music Awards.

Legacy
"Slice of Heaven" featured in Nature's Best—New Zealand's Top 30 Songs of All Time, coming in at No. 7. It was voted No. 1 in 2009 by C4 viewers as New Zealand's favourite song, and is often considered an unofficial national anthem of New Zealand, especially after its usage in New Zealand tourism ads in the 1980s and 1990s. It has also become synonymous with the Footrot Flats film.

Charts

Weekly charts

Year-end charts

Certifications

References

1986 singles
1986 songs
1987 singles
APRA Award winners
Dave Dobbyn songs
Herbs (band) songs
Number-one singles in Australia
Number-one singles in New Zealand
Songs written by Dave Dobbyn